American deathcore band Lorna Shore has released four studio albums, four EPs, seventeen singles, and eighteen videos.

Studio albums

Extended plays

Singles

Music videos

References

External links
 
 Lorna Shore discography at AllMusic
 Lorna Shore discography at Discogs
 Lorna Shore discography at MusicBrainz

Discographies of American artists
Heavy metal group discographies